Terell Allen Parks Sr. (born February 25, 1991) is an American professional basketball player for Nizhny Novgorod of the VTB United League. He is a 6'9" (2.06 m) tall center. After two years at Iowa Central Community College and two years at Western Illinois, Parks entered the 2013 NBA draft, but he was not selected in the draft's two rounds.

High school career
Parks attended Beloit Memorial High School, in Beloit, Wisconsin, where he played high school basketball. He was ranked as the 25th best power forward in the nation by 247Sports.com.

College career
Parks played college basketball at Iowa Central Community College, from 2009 to 2011, and at Western Illinois, from 2011 to 2013. As a senior, he averaged 12.6 points, 9.6 rebounds, and 2.5 blocks per game.

Professional career
After failing to be drafted in the 2013 NBA draft, Parks signed with Kolossos Rodou of the Greek Basket League, but he left the team without playing with them in a single game. He later joined Kotwica Kołobrzeg, of the Polish Basketball League (PLK). He went on to average 11.8 points, 8.2 rebounds and 1.1 blocks per game in the Polish League.

In 2016, he joined Anagennisi Germasogeias of the Cypriot League. On February 28, 2016, he signed with Šentjur of the Premier A Slovenian League. He then returned to Cyprus, and joined Keravnos. He stayed with the club for two years, and with them he won the Cypriot League championship in 2017, and also led the league in rebounds in both seasons. He was also voted as the FIBA Europe Cup's Best Defender in 2018.

On August 4, 2018, he joined Promitheas Patras of the Greek Basket League. His contract with the club was about to be terminated after their game FIBA Champions League against Beşiktaş, but after the injury of the team's other main center Octavius Ellis, Parks remained with the team. His performance with Promitheas improved, and after their game FIBA Champions League game against Neptūnas, in which Parks had 18 points, 8 rebounds, and 1 block, Promitheas decided to keep him on their squad.

On August 26, 2019, Parks signed with the newly promoted Larisa, and thus remained in the Greek Basket League. He averaged 11.8 points, 8.3 rebounds and 1.2 steals per game. On January 11, 2020, his contract was officially bought out by Russian BCL club Nizhny Novgorod and Parks moved to the VTB United League. He averaged 10 points and 7 rebounds per game before the season was suspended. Parks was released by the team on July 10.

On July 20, 2020, he signed with Cholet Basket of the LNB Pro A. Parks averaged 8.5 points and 5.8 rebounds per game in four games. He parted ways with the team on November 18.

On November 22, 2020, he signed with Bnei Herzliya of the Israeli Basketball Premier League. Parks averaged 12.5 points, 8.2 rebounds, 1.4 assists and 1.5 steals per game. On September 10, 2021, he signed with Fos Provence Basket of the LNB Pro A.

On November 15, 2022, Parks returned to Greece for Ionikos Nikaias. In February 2023, Parks returned to Nizhny Novgorod.

References

External links
FIBA Champions League profile
Eurobasket.com profile
Greek Basket League profile 
College stats @ sports-reference.com

1991 births
Living people
American expatriate basketball people in Cyprus
American expatriate basketball people in France
American expatriate basketball people in Greece
American expatriate basketball people in Israel
American expatriate basketball people in Poland
American expatriate basketball people in Russia
American expatriate basketball people in Slovenia
American men's basketball players
Basketball players from Wisconsin
BC Nizhny Novgorod players
Centers (basketball)
Cholet Basket players
Fos Provence Basket players
Ionikos Nikaias B.C. players
Iowa Central Community College alumni
Junior college men's basketball players in the United States
Keravnos B.C. players
KK Šentjur players
Larisa B.C. players
Power forwards (basketball)
Promitheas Patras B.C. players
SKK Kotwica Kołobrzeg players
Basketball players from Chicago
Western Illinois Leathernecks men's basketball players